GV (IUPAC name: 2-(Dimethylamino)ethyl N,N-dimethylphosphoramidofluoridate) is an organophosphate nerve agent. GV is a part of a new series of nerve agents with properties similar to both the "G-series" and "V-series". It is a potent acetylcholinesterase inhibitor with properties similar to other nerve agents, being a highly poisonous vapour. Treatment for poisoning with GV involves drugs such as atropine, benactyzine, obidoxime, and HI-6.

See also
Fluorotabun
Methylfluorophosphonylcholine
VG (nerve agent)

References

External links

Acetylcholinesterase inhibitors
Dimethylamino compounds
Phosphorofluoridates
G-series nerve agents